Aleksander Hint (30 November 1884 Lümanda Parish (now Saaremaa Parish), Kreis Ösel – 30 October 1943 Aral Sea) was an Estonian politician. He was a member of I Riigikogu, representing the Estonian Labour Party. He was a member of the assembly since 25 November 1921. He replaced Timotheus Grünthal.

References

1884 births
1943 deaths
People from Saaremaa Parish
People from Kreis Ösel
Estonian Labour Party politicians
Members of the Riigikogu, 1920–1923
Russian military personnel of the Russo-Japanese War